Mingdao High School is a private secondary school located at 497, Sec 1, Zhongshan Road, Wuri District, Taichung, Taiwan 41401.  The school serves grades 7-12.   There are 7,510 students. The school is served by the Ming Dao high school bus station.

Mingdao teaches 7 major subjects: Chinese, English, math, science, social science, information, and liberal arts.

Mingdao International Department 
Mingdao International Department, MDID for short, is one of the 4 departments of Mingdao. It's one of the few IB schools in Taichung.

History
Mingdao was founded in 1969 by Wang Fu-Lai and Wang Kuang-Ping. Mingdao is now composed of a junior high school, senior high school, comprehensive high school and adult school at night, with a total of 7,510 students.

Library 

There are more than 150,000 volumes in Mingdao library, including its "Si Ku Quan Shu" (Complete Collection in Four Treasuries). The library building also includes both of its Classical Chinese Literature Classrooms,  molded after ancient Chinese classrooms, and its Contemporary Literature Museum, which offers the complete works of many modern writers.

Honors 

International Schools CyberFair - 1 Gold (2005), 1 Silver (2006), 2 Honorable Mention (2004, 2007 )
Doors to Diplomacy - 1 Platinum (2007), 1 Silver (2006)
ARML American Regions Math League - 2006 2nd place B division

References

Related links 
 Official web site
 Home page of Ministry Of Education
 Mingdao Future Heir Elementary School Official web site

1969 establishments in Taiwan
Educational institutions established in 1969
High schools in Taiwan
Schools in Taichung